Katie Rebecca White (born 18 January 1983) is an English musician and member of the pop duo The Ting Tings. After some success with a girl group punk trio TKO, which supported Steps and Atomic Kitten, her father David White brought in Jules De Martino to write songs for TKO. Katie White and De Martino subsequently formed the Ting Tings in 2007.

Early life
White was raised on a farm in Lowton with her father David K. White, mother Lynne C. (Sharples) and sister Helena. White went to Lowton High School in Lowton, which has a large performing arts department. When White was 12 years old, her grandfather Ken White won £6.6million on the National Lottery and gave each of his three sons, David, Stephen and Richard, £1million. As well as buying ponies for White and her sister Helena, White's father used his share of the money to start a music management company.

Career

TKO
White started her music career aged 14 in 1997 in a girl group punk trio TKO, short for technical knock out, with two friends from Lowton school, Joanne Leeson and Emma Lally. TKO was managed by White's father's music management company. They had some success and supported Steps and Atomic Kitten. TKO also appeared on ITV's CD:UK. In March 2001, David White brought in songwriter Jules De Martino, who wrote four songs for TKO. TKO were not able to secure a record deal but released a single on the Internet.

Dear Eskiimo
White got back in touch with Jules De Martino when she was at Leeds University and he moved to Manchester. They formed a band called Dear Eskiimo (often misreported as Dead Eskimo) with a DJ friend Simon Templeman. The name was intended to be as nomadic, tribal and independent as possible. There were already several bands called "Eskimo" but Jules, who wrote the lyrics, wanted his songs to tell good stories as if in a letter, hence "Dear Eskiimo" with the odd spelling of 'Eskimo" with two 'I"s to make it stand out. Their first performance was as a support between two rock bands but it went well and they were signed up by Mercury Records at the end of 2004. Creative differences and the management style of the record label caused them to split up.

The Ting Tings

White and De Martino started a band in 2007 with White on vocals, guitar, piano and bass drum and De Martino on vocals, drums, bass, guitar and keyboards. They started writing songs together and doing short concerts. White was working in a boutique with a Chinese girl named "Ting Ting", which sounds like Mandarin Chinese for "band stand" (亭) or "listening" (聽) and White used it as the name for the band. The Ting Tings started by playing for private parties at the Islington Mill arts centre in Salford, and their debut album We Started Nothing was released on 19 May 2008. Their follow-up album Sounds from Nowheresville was released on 27 February 2012 in the UK and 15 March in the United States. In 2014, White told the Daily Record that comments by Internet trolls previously caused her to stop writing songs for six months. In 2015, she sustained a tendon injury to her left hand that caused the band to cancel its U.S. tour.

Discography

The Ting Tings released their debut album We Started Nothing on 19 May 2008. Their follow-up album Sounds from Nowheresville was released on 27 February 2012 in the UK and 15 March in the United States. Super Critical, their third album, was released on 27 October 2014.

Personal life
In a February 2022 BBC interview, White and De Martino spoke of their 20-month-old daughter and personal relationship: "The pair have previously avoided saying whether they are romantic as well as musical partners. 'We never particularly spoke about it,' the singer says. 'We always wanted to keep it quite separate from the music, but it's quite hard when you have literally a mini person. We've been together a long time now.'"

References

1983 births
Living people
English dance musicians
English multi-instrumentalists
English women guitarists
English guitarists
English women pop singers
English women singer-songwriters
Lead guitarists
Music in the Metropolitan Borough of Wigan
Musicians from Manchester
People from Lowton
21st-century English women singers
21st-century English singers
21st-century British guitarists
21st-century women guitarists